Public Health Ethics is a triannual peer-reviewed academic journal covering bioethics as it pertains to public health. It was established in 2008 and is published by Oxford University Press. The editors-in-chief are Angus Dawson (University of Sydney) and Marcel Verweij (University of Sydney). According to the Journal Citation Reports, the journal has a 2016 impact factor of 1.259.

References

External links

Bioethics journals
Public health journals
Triannual journals
Publications established in 2008
Oxford University Press academic journals
English-language journals